Long Live the Royals is an American animated sitcom miniseries created by Regular Shows writer and storyboard artist Sean Szeles. The miniseries, which aired from November 30 to December 3, 2015, on Cartoon Network, consists of four episodes, each following a member of a fictional British Royal Family as they celebrate the annual Yule Hare Festival. It remains the shortest-running Cartoon Network original series to date, with only four episodes in a single season.

Plot
Set in a contemporary world in a medieval kingdom, Long Live the Royals follows a fictional British Royal Family—King Rufus and Queen Eleanor and their children Peter, Rosalind, and Alex—as they honor the annual Yule Hare Festival. The family must battle having to rule their kingdom while maintaining a normal family at the same time. Meanwhile, the festival continues with the parties and feasts that comprise it.

Production
Long Live the Royals was created by Sean Szeles. The miniseries, announced in February 2015, is a production from Cartoon Network Studios. It is the third miniseries to air on Cartoon Network, following Over the Garden Wall a year earlier, in November 2014, and Stakes earlier in the month, in November 2015. The miniseries was adapted from a pilot released online in May 2014. Developed by Szeles in collaboration with the studios' developmental program for animated series, the pilot won him an Emmy Award at the sixty-sixth annual Primetime Creative Arts ceremony. Preceding the nomination, Szeles had worked as a supervising producer on Regular Show, another Cartoon Network production.

Four episodes of the show were produced, each lasting eleven minutes; they are set at night and follow a different character individually. Michael Ouweleen, the chief marketing officer for Cartoon Network, explained that the miniseries format allows for different artistic qualities to flourish in their shorts program and for existing pilots put on hold to come to fruition. A number of comedians were hired as the voices of primary and secondary characters. Jon Daly, Wendi McLendon-Covey, Gillian Jacobs and Nicki Rapp reprised their roles from the pilot as King Rufus, Queen Eleanor, Rosalind and Alex respectively, whilst Kieran Culkin took over from Jeremy Redleaf as the voice of Peter. Additional characters were voiced by Fred Armisen, Ellie Kemper, Ken Marino, Alfred Molina, Horatio Sanz, and Peter Serafinowicz.

Cast

Main voices

 Jon Daly – King Rufus
 Wendi McLendon-Covey – Queen Eleanor
 Jane Horrocks – Queen Eleanor (UK Version, Miniseries only)
 Gillian Jacobs – Rosalind
 Kieran Culkin – Peter
 Nicki Rapp – Alex
 Horatio Sanz – Allistair
 Peter Serafinowicz – Frederick, Announcer

Various voices

 Nonso Anozie – Demonic Hare, Gregor
 Fred Armisen – Gavin, Brody
 Julian Barratt – Harold the Guard, Ace
 Wendi McLendon-Covey – Danny
 Kieran Culkin –
 Jon Daly – Bystander, Knight #3, Ashley
 Jermaine Fowler – Demarcus
 Gillian Jacobs – Katherine, Kimber
 Ellie Kemper – Mudria
 Ken Marino – Snake
 Alfred Molina – Rupert, Neil
 Jordi Mollà – King Diego Belafonte
 Nicki Rapp –
 Jeremy Redleaf – Peter (Pilot only)
 Horatio Sanz – Knight #1, Gorgeous, Mud Dad
 Christopher Corey Smith – Frederick/Announcer (Pilot only), Knight #2
 Peter Serafinowicz – Demonic Hare

Episodes

Pilot (2014)
{|class="wikitable plainrowheaders" style="margin:auto;width:100%;"
! scope="col" style="background:#400040; color:white;"| No.
! scope="col" style="background:#400040; color:white;"| Title
! scope="col" style="background:#400040; color:white;"| Directed by
! scope="col" style="background:#400040; color:white;"| Written and storyboarded by
! scope="col" style="background:#400040; color:white;"| Original release date
|-

|}

Miniseries (2015)
{|class="wikitable plainrowheaders" style="margin:auto;width:100%;"
! scope="col" style="background:#ff80bf; color:white;"| No.
! scope="col" style="background:#ff80bf; color:white;"| Title
! scope="col" style="background:#ff80bf; color:white;"| Written and storyboarded by
! scope="col" style="background:#ff80bf; color:white;"| Original air date
! scope="col" style="background:#ff80bf; color:white;"| U.S. viewers
|-

|}

Broadcast
Long Live the Royals premiered on Cartoon Network channels in Africa on December 19, 2015 and in Australia and New Zealand on January 26, 2016. Long Live The Royals premiered on Cartoon Network UK and Ireland on September 6, 2016.

References

External links
 Sneak peek and promotional reel at TV Insider
 
 

2010s American animated television miniseries
2010s American comedy television miniseries
2015 American television series debuts
2015 American television series endings
American children's animated comedy television series
Animated television series about children
Animated television series about families
Cartoon Network original programming
English-language television shows
Monarchy in fiction